Zoropsis is a spider genus in the family Zoropsidae. The genus was described in 1878 by Eugène Simon.

Species
 Zoropsis albertisi Pavesi, 1880 (Tunisia)
 Zoropsis beccarii Caporiacco, 1935 (Turkey)
 Zoropsis bilineata Dahl, 1901 (Mallorca, Morocco, Algeria)
 Zoropsis bilineata viberti Simon, 1910 (Algeria)
 Zoropsis coreana Paik, 1978 (Korea)
 Zoropsis kirghizicus Ovtchinnikov & Zonstein, 2001 (Kyrgyzstan)
 Zoropsis lutea (Thorell, 1875) (Eastern Mediterranean, iran, Ukraine)
 Zoropsis markamensis Hu & Li, 1987 (China)
 Zoropsis media Simon, 1878 (Western Mediterranean)
 Zoropsis oertzeni Dahl, 1901 (Italy, Greece, Balkans, Turkey)
 Zoropsis pekingensis Schenkel, 1953 (China)
 Zoropsis rufipes (Lucas, 1838) (Canary Is., Madeira)
 Zoropsis saba Thaler & van Harten, 2006 (Yemen)
 Zoropsis spinimana (Dufour, 1820)  (Mediterranean to Russia (USA, introduced))
 Zoropsis thaleri Levy, 2007 (Israel)

References 

Zoropsidae
Araneomorphae genera
Spiders of Africa
Spiders of Asia